Sergey Alimzhanov (born 27 June 1966) is a Kazakhstani judoka. He competed in the men's middleweight event at the 1996 Summer Olympics.

References

External links
 

1966 births
Living people
Kazakhstani male judoka
Olympic judoka of Kazakhstan
Judoka at the 1996 Summer Olympics
Place of birth missing (living people)
Asian Games medalists in judo
Judoka at the 1994 Asian Games
Asian Games silver medalists for Kazakhstan
Medalists at the 1994 Asian Games
20th-century Kazakhstani people
21st-century Kazakhstani people